Billy-Ray Belcourt is a poet, scholar, and author from the Driftpile Cree Nation.

Belcourt's works encompass a variety of topics and themes, including decolonial love, grief, intimacy and queer sexuality, and the role of Indigenous women in social resistance movements. Belcourt is also the author of the poetry collection This Wound is a World which was chosen as one of CBC's top ten poetry collections of 2017 and won the 2018 Canadian Griffin Poetry Prize. Belcourt was the 2016 recipient of the prestigious Rhodes Scholarship and is currently an assistant professor in Indigenous Creative Writing at the University of British Columbia.

Biography 
Belcourt grew up in the community of Driftpile in northern Alberta. He was raised by his grandparents and began writing poetry around the age of 19.

As an undergraduate student, Belcourt studied Comparative Literature at the University of Alberta where he graduated with a B.A. (Hons.) with First Class Honours in 2016. While at the University of Alberta, Belcourt was actively involved as "an advocate for LGBTQ and Indigenous communities," which included serving as the Aboriginal Student Council president. Belcourt is a Youth Facilitator with the Native Youth Sexual Health Network (NYSHN).

In 2015, Belcourt was selected as a recipient of the Rhodes Scholarship to study at Wadham College, Oxford University for the 2016-2017 school year. Belcourt was the first First Nations scholar to be selected for this prestigious award and with the scholarship's announcement, he received media attention noting him as a leader, role model, and change-maker.

In 2017 Belcourt graduated with distinction from Oxford University with a master's degree in Women's Studies. His master's thesis focused on "the role of Indigenous women in social resistance movements" and is titled "Decolonial Sight: Indigenous Feminist Protest and the World-to-Come."

While an active writer and poet throughout his university career, Belcourt published his first book, This Wound is a World in 2017. This was followed by his second book in 2019: NDN Coping Mechanisms, Notes from the Field. In 2020, he released his third book, A History of My Brief Body: A Memoir, accompanied by A History of My Brief Body: Essays.

In 2020, Belcourt completed a Ph.D. in the Department of English and Film Studies at the University of Alberta. His research focuses on what he calls the 'Indigenous paranormal' in art, poetry and film that has been produced by Indigenous peoples in the region currently called Canada. In January 2020, Belcourt joined UBC’s Creative Writing Program as Associate Professor in Indigenous Creative Writing.

Writing

Books 
 A Minor Chorus: A novel, Penguin Canada (September 2022)
 A History of My Brief Body: A Memoir, Penguin Canada (August 2020)
 A History of My Brief Body: Essays, Two Dollar Radio (July 2020)
 NDN Coping Mechanisms: Notes from the Field, House of Anansi Press (2019)
 This Wound Is a World, Frontenac House (2017), edited by Micheline Maylor, (winner of the 2018 Griffin Poetry Prize, the 2018 Robert Kroetsch City of Edmonton Book Award, and a 2018 Indigenous Voices Award. Shortlisted for the 2018 Gerald Lampert Memorial Award and the 2018 Raymond Souster Award)

Essays 
 "A Poltergeist Manifesto"
"Meditations on reserve life, biosociality, and the taste of non-sovereignty." The main argument of this paper is that the feeling of indigeneity is the miserable feeling of not properly being of this world and that a disease like diabetes mellitus is a key manifestation of this sort of exhausted existence. To do this, Belcourt pursues the secondary claims that indigeneity is a zone of biological struggle and that the reserve is something of a non-place calibrated by affects the groups under the sign of misery. This is a story about the politics of interpretation, about how one takes stock of the horrors of Indigenous embodiment and how we might do it differently.

Public Scholarship 
 "The Optics of the Language: How Joi T. Arcand Looks With Words"
 with Lou Cornum, Thel Seraphim, and Kay Gabriel, "Top or Bottom: How do we desire?"
 "To be Unbodied," Canadian Art (2017): n.p.
 "The body remembers when the world broke open"
 with Maura Roberts, "Making friends for the end of the world"
 "Can the Other of Native Studies Speak?"
 "Political Depression in a Time of Reconciliation"
 "The day of the TRC Final Report: On being in this world without wanting it"

Creative Writing 
 "Bad Lover," The Journal (2019)
 "What is a Human Possibility?" The Puritan (2019)
 "NDN Homopoetics," Academy of American Poets (2019)
 "Cree Girl Explodes the Necropolis of Ottawa," BRICK (2018)
 "NDN Brothers," The Rumpus (2018)
 "The Terrible Beauty of the Reserve," The Walrus (2018)
 "What if I Never Write a Novel?" Little Fiction (2018).
 "Ode to Northern Alberta," This Magazine (2017)
 "Gay Incantations," Voicemail Poems (2017)
 "Love is a Moontime Teaching," The Malahat Review (2016)

Awards 
 Winner of the Stephan G. Stephansson Award for Poetry, NDN Coping Mechanisms (2020)
Indspire Award Youth - First Nation (2019)
Winner of Robert Kroetsch City of Edmonton Book Prize (2018)
Winner of the Indigenous Voices Award, English Poetry for This Wound Is a World (2018)
Winner of the 2018 Griffin Poetry Prize, This Wound is a World
 CBC's best book of 2017, Canadian poetry category, This Wound is a World
 Winner, P.K. Page Founder's Award for Poetry, "Love is a Moontime Teaching", (2017)
 Rhodes Scholar (2016)

Reception 
Belcourt's works have generally been welcomed with praise and appreciation. CBC featured This Wound is a World at the top of their top ten poetry collections from 2017 stating that the book "is memoiristic in approach, perspicuous in style and exacting in its determination to upend genre and form."

Leanne Betasamosake Simpson also praised Belcourt's book, choosing it as her favorite book of 2017. In Simpson's words, "Belcourt is a sovereign genius and This Wound is a World redefines poetics as a refusal of colonial erasure, a radical celebration of Indigenous life and our beautiful, intimate rebellion." Lisa Tatonetti also praises the book, calling it a "powerful meditation on the intersections of violence, love, and the body."

NDN Coping Mechanisms, Belcourt’s second book, was well received, being included in the library Journal’s list of Best Books 2019, the Writers Trust of Canada Best Books of 2019 and CBC Books Top Canadian Poetry Book of 2019. It was shortlisted for the 2020 ReLit Award for poetry.

A History of My Brief Body, his 2020 memoir, was described by Kirkus Starred Review as “An urgently needed, unyielding book of theoretical and intimate strength.” The book was a shortlisted finalist for the Lambda Literary Award for Gay Memoir or Biography at the 33rd Lambda Literary Awards.

References

External links 
 
 
 

21st-century First Nations writers
21st-century Canadian poets
Canadian male poets
Canadian LGBT poets
LGBT First Nations people
Writers from Alberta
Living people
First Nations poets
Year of birth missing (living people)
21st-century Canadian LGBT people